Islington West was a borough constituency in the Metropolitan Borough of Islington, in North London.

It returned one Member of Parliament (MP) to the House of Commons of the Parliament of the United Kingdom from 1885 until it was abolished for the 1950 general election.  Elections were held using the first past the post voting system.

Boundaries 

1918–1950: The Metropolitan Borough of Islington wards of Lower Holloway and Thornhill.

Members of Parliament

Elections

Elections in the 1880s

Elections in the 1890s

Elections in the 1900s

Elections in the 1910s 

General Election 1914–15:

Another General Election was required to take place before the end of 1915. The political parties had been making preparations for an election to take place and by the July 1914, the following candidates had been selected; 
Liberal: Thomas Lough
Unionist:

Elections in the 1920s

Elections in the 1930s 

General Election 1939–40

Another General Election was required to take place before the end of 1940. The political parties had been making preparations for an election to take place and by the Autumn of 1939, the following candidates had been selected; 
Labour: Frederick Montague
Conservative: ET Hope
Liberal: WC Woodroofe

Elections in the 1940s

See also
 List of parliamentary constituencies in Islington

References

 

Parliamentary constituencies in London (historic)
Constituencies of the Parliament of the United Kingdom established in 1885
Constituencies of the Parliament of the United Kingdom disestablished in 1950
Politics of the London Borough of Islington